J. Adam Lowe (born January 8, 1981) is an American Republican politician who serves as the senator for Tennessee's 1st Senate district. The district currently includes most of Bradley, McMinn, Meigs, and Rhea Counties, and was previously numbered as District 9 prior to the 2020 United States redistricting cycle.

Biography

J. Adam Lowe served on the Bradley County Commission for District 3 from 2010 to 2014. In October 13, Lowe announced his intent to run for Tennessee House of Representatives District 22 after then-incumbent Eric Watson announced his intent to vacate the seat to run for Bradley County Sheriff. He was defeated by Dan Howell, receiving 2,017 votes, or 42.6% of the total. He served as a delegate to the 2016 Republican National Convention.

In January 2022, announced his intent to run for then-State Senate District 9, which was being vacated by Mike Bell. He won the August 4 primary with 53% of the vote, or 9,651 total votes, defeating then-24th District State Representative Mark Hall. He defeated Democrat Patricia Waters in the general election on November 8.

Lowe is married to Rachel and has four children. He attended Lee University and the University of Tennessee.

References

Living people
Tennessee Republicans
21st-century American politicians
1981 births
University of Tennessee alumni
Lee University alumni
People from Cleveland, Tennessee
People from McMinn County, Tennessee